The Dave Brockie Experience or DBX was a rock band formed of three of the then-current members of Heavy metal band Gwar. The band was composed of David "Oderus Urungus" Brockie (vocals/bass), Brad "Jizmak Da Gusha" Roberts (drums), and Mike "Balsac the Jaws of Death" Derks (Guitar). 

The DBX was a pet project of Gwar and showed some of their earlier punk roots from the "Death Piggy" era. At their shows they played some original DBX songs as well as some tunes from Death Piggy, Gwar, and X-Cops. The band enjoyed a following mostly made up of Gwar fans. Dave Brockie hinted at the possibility of the band's breakup in the past due to the exhausting nature of lower-budget touring. 

In February 2008, several sources reported that the band would be touring as an opening act for the reunited Green Jellÿ. Dave Brockie stated on his website that this was not the case and there were no official discussions concerning the tour.

DBX played two reunion shows in August 2009.  In a more recent interview with Dave Brockie he explained a new DBX album was "possible" but said his main priority then was Gwar.

Brockie died of a heroin overdose on March 23, 2014.

Discography
 Diarrhea of a Madman
 Live From Ground Zero
 Songs for the Wrong
 Hanging Out at the Pound (DVD)

References 

Gwar
Musical groups established in 2001
Metal Blade Records artists